Maurice Bordrez is a former male French international table tennis player.

He won a bronze medal at the 1947 World Table Tennis Championships in the Swaythling Cup (men's team event). The following year he won a silver medal at the 1948 World Table Tennis Championships in the Swaythling Cup.

He was the French National champion in 1939 and 1946.

See also
 List of table tennis players
 List of World Table Tennis Championships medalists

References

French male table tennis players
World Table Tennis Championships medalists
20th-century French people